Josef Masopust (9 February 1931 – 29 June 2015) was a Czech football player and coach. He played as midfielder and was a key player for Czechoslovakia, helping them reach the 1962 FIFA World Cup Final. He was capped 63 times, scoring ten goals for his country.

He was named European Footballer of the Year in 1962. In November 2003, to celebrate UEFA's Jubilee, Masopust was selected as his country's Golden Player by the Football Association of the Czech Republic as their most outstanding player of the past 50 years.  He was named by Pelé as one of the top 125 greatest living footballers in March 2004. He is regarded as one of the greatest midfielders of all time.

Club career
Masopust's first club was lowly ZSJ Uhlomost Most, but ZSJ Technomat Teplice (renamed to ZSJ Vodotechna Teplice in 1951) signed him as a 19-year-old left-half and gave him his top-flight debut. Then, in 1952, he joined a Czechoslovak Armed Forces football club under name of ATK Praha (renamed to ÚDA Praha in 1953 and to Dukla Prague in winter 1956). Masopust won eight league championships and three national cups with Dukla. They also reached the semi-finals of the 1966–67 European Cup, losing to the eventual winners of the competition (Celtic).

When he eventually went abroad in 1968, he helped Crossing Molenbeek win promotion to the Belgian first division as player-coach. His coaching career continued at Dukla, however his only Czechoslovak league title as a coach came with Zbrojovka Brno in the 1977–78 season. Later, between 1984 and 1987, he led the Czechoslovakia national team, overseeing a total of 27 matches. He subsequently had a spell in Indonesia where he coached their national Olympic football team with Milan Bokša between 1988 and 1991.

International career
Masopust made his international debut in October 1954, in a friendly match against Hungary. He helped Czechoslovakia qualify for the 1958 FIFA World Cup, but the team were knocked out after a play-off match against Northern Ireland. He then went on to finish the 1955-60 Central European International Cup as winner i 1960. Czechoslovakia then finished in third place in the new tournament 1960 UEFA European Football Championship, losing to the Soviet Union in the semi-final and defeating France in the third place match.

In 1962, Masopust led the Czechoslovakia team that reached the 1962 FIFA World Cup Final, losing to Brazil. He scored the opening goal in the Final, but Brazil came back to win 3–1. Because of his performance at the World Cup Finals, he was named European Footballer of the Year in 1962.

Having represented the Rest of the World team against England in 1963, Masopust was invited to play for a European International XI in the farewell match for Stanley Matthews, when the 50-year-old Matthews retired from football in 1965. Czechoslovakia failed to qualify for the 1966 World Cup; Masopust had only played in one qualification match, a 1–0 defeat against Romania in May 1965. His last international appearance was in May 1966, in a friendly match against the Soviet Union. Overall, he was capped 63 times for his country, scoring ten goals.

Style of play
Early in his career, Masopust played as a left half. By the time of the 1962 World Cup, he had moved to the centre half position.

Masopust was in a similar mould to that of the Hungarian József Bozsik; a workhorse of his team, who also created attacking opportunities. He had excellent ball control, which he utilised for both recovering the ball in defence and dribbling past opponents.  Like Bozsik, Masopust was also an excellent passer of the ball. He was not great at tackling opponents, but he compensated for this by anticipating his opponents' actions and intercepting their passes.

Shackled by Czechoslovakia's 'no-risk' style philosophy, Masopust's natural inclination for attack was limited, yet he still managed ten goals in 63 caps for his country. At club level he scored 79 times in 386 appearances for Dukla Prague. Many of his Dukla teammates also played for the national team, which gave them a greater understanding than some of their opponents.

Legacy
A statue of Masopust was built outside Dukla's Stadion Juliska and was unveiled in June 2011.

Death
Masopust died on 29 June 2015 at his home in Prague at the age of 84. Although no cause of death was given, public Czech Television stated that he had been battling a lengthy serious illness.

Career statistics

International

Scores and results list Czechoslovakia's goal tally first, score column indicates score after each Masopust goal.

Honours
Dukla Prague
Czechoslovak First League: 1953, 1956, 1957–58, 1960–61, 1961–62, 1962–63, 1963–64, 1965–66
Czechoslovak Cup: 1960–61, 1964–65, 1965–66
International Soccer League: 1961
American Challenge Cup: 1962, 1963, 1964

Czechoslovakia
 Central European International Cup: 1955-60
 UEFA European Championship Bronze: 1960
 FIFA World Cup Runner-up: 1962

Individual
Ballon d'Or: 1962
UEFA European Championship Team of the Tournament: 1960
FIFA World Cup Silver Ball: 1962
FIFA World Cup All-Star Team: 1962
World Soccer World XI: 1962, 1964
Czechoslovak Footballer of the Year: 1966
UEFA Czech Golden Player: 2003
FIFA 100
UEFA President's Award: 2014

References

External links

 Short biography 
 1962 – JOSEF MASOPUST – LA PRIME AU COLLECTIF, France Football
 

1931 births
2015 deaths
UEFA Golden Players
Sportspeople from Most (city)
Czech footballers
Czechoslovak footballers
Czechoslovakia international footballers
Ballon d'Or winners
FIFA 100
1958 FIFA World Cup players
1960 European Nations' Cup players
1962 FIFA World Cup players
FK Teplice players
Dukla Prague footballers
Czech football managers
Czechoslovak football managers
Czechoslovakia national football team managers
Dukla Prague managers
FC Zbrojovka Brno managers
Recipients of Medal of Merit (Czech Republic)
Czechoslovak expatriate footballers
Czechoslovak expatriate sportspeople in Belgium
Expatriate footballers in Belgium
K.V.V. Crossing Elewijt players
Association football midfielders
Czechoslovak expatriate sportspeople in Indonesia